Vanhakylä ("Old Village") or Vanha-Ulvila ("Old Ulvila") is a conurbation and sparsely populated rural area in Ulvila, Finland. The urban area is situated on the eastern bank of the Kokemäenjoki river, which forms the eastern part of the centre of Ulvila.

History 
Medieval Ulvila used to be located in Vanhakylä, where the current name dates back to. There are still a few monuments of Medieval Ulvila in Vanhakylä, for example the  archaeological area and the Medieval Church of Ulvila. The church is located on the outskirts of the former conurbation in the place where medieval Ulvila was located.

Additional information 
 Avellan, Niilo J.: "Entisen Ulvilan pitäjän maatilat II: Vanhakylä", Satakunta - Kotiseutututkimuksia III, p. 115–121. Toinen painos. Satakuntalainen osakunta, 1928.

Ulvila